Páll Hermann Kolbeinsson (born 17 April 1964) is an Icelandic former basketball player and coach, and a former member of the Icelandic national team. He was named the Icelandic Basketball Player of the Year and Úrvalsdeild Domestic Player of the Year in 1990, the same year he won the Icelandic championship with KR. He played college basketball for University of Wisconsin–Oshkosh.

Coaching career
Páll was hired as a player-coach for KR in 1990 and guided the team to the Icelandic Basketball Cup in 1991. He later served as a player-coach for Tindastóll. In 2010, he was hired as the head coach of KR. He stepped down as head coach following KR's loss to Snæfell in the semi-finals of the Úrvalsdeild playoffs on 15 April 2010.

National team
Páll played 43 games for the Icelandic national team from 1986 to 1992.

Awards, titles and accomplishments

Individual awards
Icelandic Basketball Player of the Year: 1990
Úrvalsdeild Domestic Player of the Year: 1990
Úrvalsdeild Domestic All-First Team: 1990

Titles
Icelandic champion: 1990
Icelandic Basketball Cup (2): 1984, 1991

Accomplishments
Úrvalsdeild assists leader: 1990

Personal life
Páll is the son of former Icelandic national team player Kolbeinn Pálsson. His aunt, Vigdís Pálsdóttir, played handball for Valur.

References

External links
Úrvalsdeild statistics at Icelandic Basketball Association

1964 births
Living people
Pall Kolbeinsson
Pall Kolbeinsson
Pall Kolbeinsson
Pall Kolbeinsson
Pall Kolbeinsson
Pall Kolbeinsson
Pall Kolbeinsson
Pall Kolbeinsson
Pall Kolbeinsson
Wisconsin–Oshkosh Titans men's basketball players